The Northwestern Oklahoma Railroad  is a shortline railroad operating in Woodward, Oklahoma that operates approximately  of track. Founded in 1973, the railroad provides switching services for industrial customers and interchanges with the BNSF Railway in Woodward. Primary commodities carried include drilling mud, oilfield pipe, and sand to support the oil industry.

References

External links 

 

Oklahoma railroads
Switching and terminal railroads
Spin-offs of the Missouri–Kansas–Texas Railroad